The 1955–56 Panhellenic Championship was the 20th season of the highest football league of Greece and an exceptionally interesting championship, since 5 out of the 6 teams were challenging for the title until the final fixture, while Aris was left behind from the beginning. In the end Olympiacos won their 12th championship (3 consecutive) although he started with 4 consecutive draws.

Before the final stage , in that year, they were two qualification stages. Initially from the groups of the "founding" associations the results were as follows:
Athenian Championship: The first 3 teams of the ranking.
Piraeus' Championship: The first 2 teams of the ranking.
Macedonian Championship: The first 2 teams of the ranking.

Subsequently, 3 new groups were created with geographical criteria where a total of 14 teams participated. The 7 came from the 3 founding associations and the other 7 came from the winners of the regional championships of the same number. Finally, the teams that participated in the final phase of the championship resulted as follows:
Northern Group: The first 2 teams of the ranking.
Central Group: The first 2 teams of the ranking.
Southern Group: The first 2 teams of the ranking.

The point system was: Win: 3 points - Draw: 2 points - Loss: 1 point.

Qualification round

Athens Football Clubs Association

Piraeus Football Clubs Association

Macedonia Football Clubs Association

Semi–final Round

Northern Group

Central Group

Southern Group

Final round

League table

Top scorers

External links
Rsssf, 1955-56 championship

Panhellenic Championship seasons
1955–56 in Greek football
Greek